Siler is an unincorporated community in Frederick County, Virginia, United States. Siler is located in northern Frederick County on Brush Creek at the crossroads of Brush Creek, Howards Chapel (VA 690), and Siler Roads.

References

Unincorporated communities in Frederick County, Virginia
Unincorporated communities in Virginia